Gia Oles Tis Fores (trans. Για Όλες Τις Φορές; For All The Times) is an album by the Greek singer Mando.

It was released οn June 9, 1997 in Greece and Cyprus by Sony Music Greece and received Gold certification. Supported by the single "Daneika", the album went on to receive nominations by "Pop Corn" magazine. Phoebus wrote 9 songs for this album.

Track listing

Singles and Music videos 
The following tracks becoming radio singles, and some of them have music videos. The tracks "Erastes Kai Dolofonoi", "Ola Ki Ola" and "Gine" despite not having been released as singles, managed to gain radio airplay.

 Gia Oles Tis Fores (For All The Times)
 Daneika (Borrowed)
 Faros (Lighthouse)
 Mataia (In Vain)

Credits and Personnel 
Personnel

 Arrangement, Keyboards: Charis Andreadis (tracks: 8, 12), Orestis Plakidis (tracks: 3), Dimitris Panopoulos (tracks: 4, 5, 6, 13, 14, 15), Phoebus (tracks: 1, 2, 7, 9, 10, 11)
 Backing vocals: Katerina Adamantidou (tracks: 8), Stelios Goulielmos (tracks: 1, 2, 7, 9, 10), Rania Dizikiriki (tracks: 1, 2, 7, 9, 10), Vanesa Karageorgou (tracks: 5, 14, 15), Elli Kokkinou (tracks: 1, 2, 7, 9, 10), Dimos Mpeke (tracks: 1, 2, 7, 9, 10), Poimis Petrou (tracks: 5, 14, 15), Sissy Stamatopoulou (tracks: 5, 14, 15), Eva Tselidou (tracks: 8)
 Baglama, Bouzouki: Giannis Mpithikotsis (tracks: 2, 11, 12)
 Bass: Giorgos Kostoglou (tracks: 1, 2, 10, 12)
 Clarinet: Thanasis Vasilopoulos (tracks: 1, 4, 6)
 Cura: Giannis Mpithikotsis (tracks: 6, 10, 14)
 Cümbüş: Antonis Gounaris (tracks: 6, 7)
 Drums: Andreas Mouzakis (tracks: 2, 11)
 Guitars: Antonis Gounaris (tracks: 1, 2, 3, 4, 5, 6, 7, 9, 10, 11, 13, 14, 15)
 Mandolin: Giannis Mpithikotsis (tracks: 3)
 Ney: Thanasis Vasilopoulos (tracks: 6, 8)
 Percussion: Giorgos Roilos (tracks: 1, 4, 6, 7, 8, 9, 10, 12, 14)
 Programming: Dimitris Mpellos (tracks: 8, 12), Orestis Plakidis (tracks: 3), Dimitris Panopoulos (tracks: 4, 5, 6, 13, 14, 15), Phoebus (tracks: 1, 2, 7, 9, 10, 11)
 Saxophone: Thimios Papadopoulos (tracks: 5)
 Säzi: Hakan (tracks: 8)
 Second vocal: Thodoris Lizos (tracks: 12), Mando (tracks: 9, 11)
 Violin: Nikos Chatzopoulos (tracks: 8), Thanos Gkiouletzis (tracks: 15)

Production

 Artwork: Antonis Glikos
Background photo: Tony Stone Images
Executive producer: Giannis Doulamis
Hair styling: Stefanos Vasilakis
Make up: Aggelos Charitos
Mastering: Giannis Ioannidis [D.P.H.]
 Mixing, Recording: Manolis Vlachos [Phase One studio]
 Photo editor: Apostolos Michalis
Photographer: Tasos Vrettos
Printing: Michalis Orfanos
Styling: Efi Lioli

References

1997 albums
Greek-language albums
Mando (singer) albums
Sony Music Greece albums